Nikolay Sergeyevich Chebotko (25 October 1982 – 24 January 2021) was a Kazakhstani cross-country skier who competed from 2000, until his death. His best individual World Cup finish was fourth in a sprint event in Finland in 2013.

Chebotko also competed in four Winter Olympics, earning his best finish of fifth in the team sprint event at Vancouver in 2010. His best finish at the FIS Nordic World Ski Championships is bronze medal at Team sprint 2013.

Chebotko died in a car accident near Borovoye on 24 January 2021.

Career highlights
FIS Nordic World Ski Championships Medals
2013 – Val di Fiemme  3rd, team freestyle sprint (with Poltoranin)

Universiade
2003 –  Tarvisio  1st, freestyle sprint
2005 –  Innsbruck/Seefeld  2nd, 10 km freestyle
2007 –  Pragelato  1st, freestyle sprint

Asian Winter Games
2003 –  Aomori   2nd, 4×10 km relay
2007 –  Changchun  1st, 4×10 km relay
2011 –  Almaty  1st, team freestyle sprint (with Poltoranin)
2011 –  Almaty  1st, 4×10 km relay (with Cherepanov / Poltoranin / Velichko)
2011 –  Almaty  2nd, classical sprint
2011 –  Almaty  2nd, 10 km classical individual
2011 –  Almaty  3rd, 15 km freestyle

World Cup podiums
2013 –  Quebec  1st, team freestyle sprint (with Volotka)
2013 –  Asiago  2nd, team classical sprint (with Poltoranin)

Stage World Cup podiums
2008 –  Asiago  2nd, freestyle sprint (Tour de Ski)
2008 –  Nove Mesto  3rd, 15 km classical (Tour de Ski)
2009 –  Val di Fiemme  3rd, 20 km classical mass start (Tour de Ski)

References

External links
 
 
 

1982 births
2021 deaths
Cross-country skiers at the 2002 Winter Olympics
Cross-country skiers at the 2006 Winter Olympics
Cross-country skiers at the 2010 Winter Olympics
Cross-country skiers at the 2014 Winter Olympics
Kazakhstani male cross-country skiers
Olympic cross-country skiers of Kazakhstan
Asian Games medalists in cross-country skiing
Cross-country skiers at the 2003 Asian Winter Games
Cross-country skiers at the 2007 Asian Winter Games
Cross-country skiers at the 2011 Asian Winter Games
Cross-country skiers at the 2017 Asian Winter Games
Medalists at the 2007 Winter Universiade
Asian Games gold medalists for Kazakhstan
Asian Games silver medalists for Kazakhstan
Asian Games bronze medalists for Kazakhstan
Medalists at the 2003 Asian Winter Games
Medalists at the 2007 Asian Winter Games
Medalists at the 2011 Asian Winter Games
Medalists at the 2017 Asian Winter Games
Universiade gold medalists for Kazakhstan
Universiade silver medalists for Kazakhstan
Universiade medalists in cross-country skiing
Medalists at the 2003 Winter Universiade
Competitors at the 2005 Winter Universiade
Cross-country skiers at the 2007 Winter Universiade
Road incident deaths in Kazakhstan
21st-century Kazakhstani people